A list of films produced in Egypt in 1941. For an A-Z list of films currently on Wikipedia, see :Category:Egyptian films.

External links
 Egyptian films of 1941 at the Internet Movie Database
 Egyptian films of 1941 elCinema.com

Lists of Egyptian films by year
1941 in Egypt
Lists of 1941 films by country or language